Ena Anglein von Baer Jahn (born 28 November 1974 sge in Temuco) is a Chilean journalist, political scientist and senator.

In December 2009, von Baer lost a very tight race for a seat in the Senate. In March 2010 she became Minister Secretary-General of Government. In July 2011 she was designated senator, replacing Pablo Longueira, who left the senate to become Minister of Economy.

Prior to her work in the government, von Baer was a panelist on a televised political show and worked for the right-wing think-tank Instituto Libertad y Desarrollo.

Biography
Upon her return to Chile in 2002, von Baer worked as researcher for the political science department at the Liberty & Development Institute (Instituto Libertad y Desarrollo or LyD). She then served as the Academic Director of the School of Government in the Adolfo Ibáñez University, a position which she later abandoned in order to return to LyD as Director of its Social and Political Program. She dedicated her work to research into political systems and electoral studies, and to developing social politics related to poverty and indigenous peoples. She also worked as a legislative advisor, especially in the subject of automatic electoral enrollment and voluntary vote. During the same time, she was a professor at the Faculty of Government at the University for Development and a panelist on a program of Televisión Nacional de Chile, Estado Nacional.

Political career
On 9 February 2010, President Piñera named von Baer as Minister Secretary-General of Government. She took office on 11 March 2010. At the president's request, she resigned in July, 2011. A few days later, she was designated as senator.

In 2011 von Baer was used as an example of someone in the government with family members who have acquired the patents for crops and will benefit from the privatisation of seed.

For the 2013 parliamentary election she first intended run as senator for the same district she was representing -Santiago Oriente. However the Independent Democratic Union (UDI) assigned instead Laurence Golborne as their candidate there. Von Baer was however allowed a slot by UDI to run for  Circunscripción Nº 16, Los Ríos Region, where she was actually elected. Her campaign was financed by SOQUIMICH and was actually the parliament election campaign that spent most money per vote obtained in that election in the whole of Chile.

Bibliography

References

External links

1974 births
Academic staff of Adolfo Ibáñez University
Chilean Lutherans
Chilean people of German descent
Chilean women journalists
government ministers of Chile
Independent Democratic Union politicians
living people
members of the Senate of Chile
people from Temuco
Pontifical Catholic University of Chile alumni
Academic staff of the University for Development
women members of the Senate of Chile
women government ministers of Chile
Chilean Ministers Secretary General of Government
Senators of the LV Legislative Period of the National Congress of Chile